Ferenc Elek (born 3 June 1974) is a Hungarian actor. He appeared in more than ninety films since 1987. He is best known for his performance as Zoli in Question in Details.

References

External links 

1974 births
Living people
Hungarian male film actors